Egypt, with eleven gold medals, ten silver medals, and thirteen bronze medals, ranked at number seven in the 2009 Mediterranean Games.

Nations at the 2009 Mediterranean Games
2009
Mediterranean Games